Lee John Marland (born 21 September 1975) is an English cricketer.  Marland is a right-handed batsman who bowled right-arm off break.  He was born at Withington, Manchester.

Marland made his Minor Counties Championship debut for Cheshire against Wales Minor Counties in 1998.  He played 2 further Championship matches for the county against Herefordshire in 1998 and Wiltshire in 1999.

Marland represented the Warwickshire Cricket Board in a single List A match against Herefordshire in the 1st round of the 2003 Cheltenham & Gloucester Trophy which was held in 2002.  In his only List A match, he scored 39 runs and took a single catch.

References

External links
Lee Marland at Cricinfo
Lee Marland at CricketArchive

1975 births
Living people
People from Withington
English cricketers
Cheshire cricketers
Warwickshire Cricket Board cricketers